Medvejie Lake is a long, narrow, snow-fed lake on Baranof Island just south of Sitka, Alaska in the Alaskan Panhandle, which drains into Silver Bay,  southeast of Sitka, on west coast of Baranof Island, Alexander Archipelago.

Etymology 
Medvejie is derived from the Russian word meaning "bear." Most likely the lake's name comes as a holdover from Russian colonization of Alaska and the Sitka area.

Also known as:
Bear Lake
Medvejia Lake

Geography
Little forested land exists between the mountains and shores of the lake owing to the precipitous rise of surrounding topography. As such, the geography of the area creates a narrow natural wind tunnel making blowdowns very common inside the valley. In the winter, with little or no water flowing into the lake due to all precipitation in the lake's watershed falling as snow, the lake usually freezes over and slowly shrinks into itself abandoning shards of ice that are strewn on the exposed former lakebottom. Medvejie Lake's outlet stream empties into Bear Cove, Silver Bay, and the Pacific Ocean.

Temperature
The temperature in the Medvejie Lake valley, partly due to sunlight blocked by surrounding peaks (but also because of air cooled by snow from surrounding mountains and icefields that flows into the valley basin), is roughly five degrees colder than Sitka or the Medvejie Fish Hatchery's temperature. A salmon hatchery sits at the mouth of Medvejie Lake's roughly mile-long outlet stream.

Outdoor opportunities
Medvejie Lake serves as a recreational gateway to inland destinations such as Peak 5390 and Indigo Lake. Medvejie Lake is also the beginning (or ending) segment of the Baranof Cross-Island Trail.

Two modes exist to travel past the lake and up the valley: An untidy and bouldery hunter's trail along the north shore of the lake, and an assortment of communal canoes and paddles are located at the outlet of the lake.

Hatchery staff and the City of Sitka also collaborate to maintain a well-kept trail from Bear Cove to the outlet of Medvejie Lake.

See also 
List of lakes of Alaska

References 

Lakes of Alaska
Lakes of Sitka, Alaska
Glacial lakes of the United States